Marco Börries (born 1 August 1968) is a German IT entrepreneur. He is best known as the founder of Star Division, who developed StarOffice, which later became OpenOffice.org.

Career 

Inspired by a student exchange program to Silicon Valley while he attended a Gymnasium in Lüneburg, Marco Börries founded Star Division as a garage company at the age of 16. As its first product the company distributed StarWriter, a word processor application developed by friends, as an alternative to Microsoft's office package. StarWriter later became StarOffice (and thereby was the foundation to OpenOffice and LibreOffice).

StarOffice was sold over 25 million times. On 5 August 1999 Börries sold Star Division to Sun Microsystems, where Börries was subsequently briefly employed.

In parallel to Star Division Börries also founded the Hamburg-based company Star Finanz as a joint venture with Deutsche Sparkassen-Organisation, a German savings bank. With StarMoney the company grew to become a significant provider of home banking software in the years following. In early 2001, Börries sold his shares in this company as well.

In August 2001, Börries founded VerdiSoft and served as its CEO. The company developed the Yahoo! Go technology to enable mobile phones to have screen-optimized access to emails, photos, messages and other web content. VerdiSoft including its technology know-how was sold to Yahoo in February 2005, where Börries worked as an Executive Vice President in the Connected Life division until April 2009.

Until 2008 Börries lived with his wife and three children in California, but then moved to Hamburg and Berlin in Germany.

On 1 September 2009, Marco Börries launched his latest business idea, NumberFour AG, based in Berlin. The company developed an open software platform (PaaS) for the development, distribution and marketing of vertical solutions for small businesses. After four years of development, Börries gathered 38 million USDs from financial investors in mid 2013. Renamed  AG, the company launched a platform for small business in March 2017 connecting online services, software and hardware (PoS terminals).

Other entrepreneurial activities that did not lead to market entries were Adhoc Mobile GmbH, founded in 2009, and Mag10 GmbH, founded in 2010. This was a company to develop a solution for tablet publishing, but was shelved at the end of 2011.

References

Further reading

External links 

 

Businesspeople from Lower Saxony
1968 births
Living people
People from Lüneburg